The 1967 Ole Miss Rebels football team represented the University of Mississippi during the 1967 NCAA University Division football season. The Rebels were led by 21st-year head coach Johnny Vaught and played their home games at Hemingway Stadium in Oxford, Mississippi and Mississippi Veterans Memorial Stadium in Jackson. The team competed as members of the Southeastern Conference, finishing in fourth. Ole Miss finished the regular season with a record of 6–3–1 and were invited to their 11th consecutive bowl game, the 1966 Sun Bowl, where they lost to UTEP.

Schedule

Roster
DB #35 Tommy Luke

References

Ole Miss
Ole Miss Rebels football seasons
Ole Miss Rebels football